ESPD is the European Single Procurement Document

ESPD may also refer to:
End stage pulmonary disease 
European Solar Physics Division, division of the European Physical Society